Nikola VI Zrinski  (Nicholas VI Zrinski), (c. 1570 in Čakovec(?) – 24 March 1625 in Čakovec), was a Croatian count, a member of the Zrinski noble family.

Life
He was the son of Croatian count Juraj IV Zrinski and the grandson of the famous Ban of Croatia, Nikola IV Zrinski (1508–1566), the hero of Szigetvar. His younger brother Juraj V became the Croatian Ban in 1622.

Living mostly in his large Međimurje estate, the northernmost part of Croatia, with the strongly fortified Čakovec Castle, he held since 1608 the title of Captain general of Transdanubia, a region in Hungary, and fought the invasive Turkish forces.

After the death of his father in 1603 he inherited large estates throughout Croatia, which was at that time heavily endangered by the Ottomans and squeezed along its northwestern borders, with the remaining parts then called the "reliquiae reliquiarum olim inclyti regni Croatiae" ("remnants of the once great and glorious Kingdom of Croatia"). Nikola VI Zrinski possessed the following estates: Međimurje in the north, then Vrbovec, Rakovec,  Lonjica and Božjakovina in Prigorje, Medvedgrad, Šestine, Lukavec and Brezovica at Zagreb,  Ozalj, Ribnik, Dubovac and some other estates near Karlovac, Brod na Kupi,  Čabar, Gerovo and several smaller manors in Gorski kotar, as well as Bakar, Grobnik, Hreljin, Grižane, Kraljevica and other properties on the Adriatic coast and its hinterland. On those estates there were about thirty castles and fortifications that protected and defended them.

Because of his marriage with countess Anna, daughter of Ferenc Nádasdy, as a son-in-law participated in 1610–1611 in the arrest and trial of Elizabeth Báthory, the Countess Dracula.

Since there were no children in his marriage with Anna, his brother Juraj V succeeded him when he died in 1625. Less than two years later, after Juraj's sudden death, Juraj sons and Nikola VI's nephews Nikola VII and Petar IV, both future distinguished Croatian Bans, became his successors.

See also
 Zrinski family
 Zrinski family tree
 Čakovec Castle

References

External links
 

Zrinski
Croatian military personnel in Austrian armies
Counts of Croatia
Croatian Roman Catholics
16th-century Croatian nobility
1570s births
1625 deaths
16th-century Croatian military personnel
17th-century Croatian military personnel